Sevda Kılınç Çırakoğlu (born 25 May 1993) is a Turkish female para athlete competing in the  T12  disability class middle-distance events of 400m and 1500m.

Private life
Sevda Kılınç Çırakoğlu was born in Ankara, Turkey on 25 May 1993. 
She studied Physical Education and Sport at Burdur Mehmet Akif Ersoy University.

Sport career
Kılınç Çırakoğlu is a member of Yenimahalle Belediyesi Visual Impaireds Sport Club in Ankara.

She won the gold medal in the 1500m T12 event at the seventh leg of the 2019 IPC Para-Athletich World Grand Prix held in Tunisia. At the 2021 IPC Para-Athletics World Grand Prix in Dubaş, United Arab Emirates, she captured the gold medal in the 400m T12 event, and set a new Turkish national record with 59.16. She took the gold medal in the 400m T12 event of the 2021 World Para Athletics European Championships in Bydgoszcz, Poland.

References

1993 births
Living people
Sportspeople from Ankara
Female competitors in athletics with disabilities
Turkish blind people
Visually impaired middle-distance runners
Turkish female middle-distance runners
Turkish female sprinters
Medalists at the World Para Athletics European Championships
20th-century Turkish sportswomen
21st-century Turkish sportswomen